The University of Faisalabad (TUF) is a private university located in Faisalabad, Punjab, Pakistan. 

It was established in 2002 under the auspices of Madina Foundation, a not for profit philanthropic organization in the light of the vision "Industry, Service, Education" of its founder: the late Chairman Haji Muhammad Saleem. It offers programs in Pharmaceutical Sciences, Medicine, Allied Health Sciences, Engineering, Information Technology, Management Studies, Arts and Social Sciences.

Accreditation 
The University of Faisalabad, all programs are accredited with its respective accreditation councils and the governing bodies of Government of Pakistan:
 Higher Education Commission of Pakistan (HEC)
 Pakistan Medical and Dental Council (PMDC)
 Pharmacy Council of Pakistan (PCP)
 Pakistan Nursing Council (PNC)
 Pakistan Engineering Council (PEC)

History of TUF 
On March 17, 2002, Madinah Foundation launched a mega project to overcome a deficit of quality education in the district of Faisalabad. The University was an initiative to cater to the educational and technological necessity emerging in the country's industrial hub with a progressive and missionary commitment to high quality of education. 
The University of Faisalabad is W-4 category University because it has the renowned faculty programs, infrastructure, resources, laboratories, training facilities and endowment funds.

Campuses

Health Sciences Wing
Health Sciences (females only) wing is located on Sargodha Road, Faisalabad, near the motorway exit toll plaza. This wing houses MBBS, BDS, Pharm D, Rehabilitation Sciences, Optometry, Nutritional Sciences, Imaging Sciences, Medical Laboratory Sciences, Dermatological Sciences and Nursing.

Engineering Wing
Engineering wing (co-education) is located on the west canal road in the vicinity of the Faisalabad Chamber of Commerce & Industry and National Textile University. It has lush green surroundings and is easily accessible from all sides of the city. This wing houses the Departments of Electrical, Chemical and Civil Engineering, Management Studies and Computational Sciences.

Faculties & Departments

Faculty of Pharmaceutical Sciences
Department of Pharmacy

Faculty of Medicine & Allied Health Sciences 

School of Nursing
Department of Pathology
Department of Optometry
Department of Dermatology
Department of Basic Sciences
Department of Dental Sciences 
Department of Nutrition & Dietetics
Department of Rehabilitation Sciences
Department of Radiology & Medical Imaging 
Department of Professional Health Technologies

Faculty of Engineering & Technology

Department of Civil Engineering
Department of Electrical Engineering
Department of Chemical Engineering
Department of Engineering Technology

Faculty of Information Technology
Department of Computational Sciences

Faculty of Management Studies
Department of Management Studies
Department of Aviation Management

Faculty of Arts and Social Sciences

Department of Interior Design
Department of Arabic and Islamic Studies
Department of English Language & Literature

University Medical & Dental College

(Affiliated with University of Health Sciences, Lahore)
Bachelor of Medicine and Bachelor of Surgery (MBBS)
Bachelor of Dental Surgery (BDS)

Madina Foundation, following the vision of its founder, the late Chairman Mian Muhammad Saleem, established the Medical College in 2003 to fill a vacuum in medical education in Faisalabad. This college is for female students only.

Students societies 
 Faith-based society
 Literary society
 Cultural society
 Community services society
 Dramatic society
 Musical society
 Art society
 Publication society
 Sports society
 Blood donor’s society
 Model united nations society
 Photography society
 Adventure society
 Student welfare society
 Character building society
 Rehabilitation society

International collaboration 
The University of Faisalabad has international linkage to collaborate with Foreign universities. The purpose is to increase students ease of international travel and research.

 Victoria University, Melbourne, Australia (VU)
 Asian Institute of Technology, Bangkok, Thailand (AIT)
 The University of Bradford (UOB), United Kingdom
 University of Health Sciences (UHS)
 University of Agriculture Faisalabad (UAF)
 National Fertilizer Corporation – Institute of Engineering and Fertilizer Research
 International Islamic University, Islamabad
 The Society of Dyers and Colourists, UK
 National Productivity Organization (NPO), Ministry of Industry, Production & Special Initiatives, Government of Pakistan
 Small and Medium Entrepreneurs Development Authority (SMEDA)
 Faisalabad Chamber of Commerce and Industry (FCCI)
 Oiltek Sdn Bhd, Malaysia
 NG Metalurgica, Ltda, Brazil
 Guangzhou Guangzhong Enterprise Group Corporation, China
 National Foundation for Resource Development
 SPRAY Engineering Devices Limited, India
 Gift University, Gujranwala
 University of Idaho, USA
 University of Lahore
 King Edward Medical University Lahore
 National Institute for Biotechnology & Genetic Engineering (NIBGE) Faisalabad
 Istanbul Medeniyet University Turkey
 Association of Business Executives UK
 Kotler Impact, the globally renowned strategic marketing community

Scholarships 
 Merit-based scholarships
 Alumni scholarship
 Kinship scholarship
 Outstanding sportsmen/women scholarship
 Special person scholarship
 Fatima, Zainab, and Eafuzq scholarships
 Scholarship for SOS Village

Journal and Publication 
Research articles by the University academic staff has been published in more than 50+ reputable Academic Journals. The University of Faisalabad has also been publishing JUMDC quarterly, a peer-evaluated Journal of University Medical and Dental College.

FM Tufian: 96.6 
The University of Faisalabad has its own Educational Radio Channel FM 96.6 which was launched in 2014. It broadcasts programs related to education, health and social welfare.

Madina Teaching Hospital 
Madina Teaching hospital is a General Hospital consists of 600 beds attached to the Saleem Campus. It is approved by Pakistan Medical and Dental Council (PMDC), University of Health Sciences (UHS), and Pakistan Nursing Council (PNC).

References

External links
 TUF official website
 Madina Group of Industries official website

Universities and colleges in Faisalabad District
Educational institutions established in 2002
2002 establishments in Pakistan
Private universities and colleges in Punjab, Pakistan
Engineering universities and colleges in Pakistan